Liebling is the second studio album by Swedish musician Andreas Johnson. It was released on 25 May 1999 through Warner Music Group.

Track listing
"Glorious"
"People"
"The Games We Play"
"Do You Believe in Heaven"
"Should Have Been Me"
"Breathing"
"Patiently"
"Spaceless"
"Please (Do Me Right)"
"Safe from Harm"
"Unbreakable 11b - Honeydrop (starts 2.57)"

Contributors
Andreas Johnson - vocals, guitar
Peter Kvint - guitar, keyboard, song
Jerker Odelholm - bass
Andreas Dahlbäck - drums, percussion

Charts

References

External links

1999 albums
Andreas Johnson albums